Joseph Vallier (1869-1935) was a French lawyer and politician. He served as a member of the French Senate from 1920 to 1935, representing Isère.

References

1869 births
1935 deaths
Politicians from Grenoble
French Senators of the Third Republic
Senators of Isère